Gloria Inzua (born 17 November 1946) is a Mexican volleyball player. She competed in the women's tournament at the 1968 Summer Olympics.

References

1946 births
Living people
Mexican women's volleyball players
Olympic volleyball players of Mexico
Volleyball players at the 1968 Summer Olympics
Sportspeople from Tamaulipas